Aaron Douglas is an American former professional basketball player.

High school career
Douglas attended West Florence High School in his native Florence, South Carolina, where he played basketball and became the top scorer in school history. As a sophomore, he averaged 16 points per game en route to his first all-city selection. As a junior, he led the city in scoring with 21.1 points per game to earn his first all-state selection. He scored a school-record 38 points in a win over Conway High School in January 1977. As a senior, he averaged 21 points and 10 rebounds per game to earn his second straight all-state selection, leading his team to a 22–3 record. He committed to Anderson Junior College in Anderson, South Carolina.

College career
He played his first two years of college basketball at Anderson Junior College. As a freshman, he was named the most valuable player of the  Tournament and a member of the all-WCJCC second-team. As a sophomore he averaged 18 points per game and led the Trojans to an appearance in the National Junior College Tournament, earning junior college honorable mention All-American and first-team all-WCJCC honors. He was selected to the Junior College All-American Game, where he recorded 10 points and 12 assists.

Douglas transferred to East Tennessee State University, playing for the Buccaneers from 1980 to 1982. Initially recruited as a point guard, he led the team with 52 assists during the 1980–81 season. However, he was converted to the shooting guard position to fill in for injured teammate Troy Lee Mikell, and became known for his outside shooting. He majored in physical education.

Professional career
Douglas played in the Australian National Basketball League (NBL) for the Hobart Devils during the 1985 season. He averaged 24.7 points, 4.1 rebounds and 3.8 assists in 16 games played.

References

External links
College statistics

Year of birth missing (living people)
Living people
American expatriate basketball people in Australia
American men's basketball players
Anderson Trojans men's basketball players
East Tennessee State Buccaneers men's basketball players
Guards (basketball)
Hobart Devils players
Basketball players from South Carolina
Sportspeople from Florence, South Carolina